Bilel or Billel is a masculine Arabic given name, and variant of the more common Bilal.

People with the name include:

Bilel
Bilel Ifa (born 1990), Tunisian football player
Bilel Mohsni (born 1987), French-Tunisian football player
Bilel Slimani (born 1989), Algerian football player

Billel
Billel Attafen (born 1985), Algerian football player
Billel Benaldjia (born 1988), Algerian football player 
Billel Dziri (born 1972), Algerian football player
Billel Naïli (born 1986), Algerian football player
Billel Omrani (born 1993), French football player 
Bilel Slimani (born 1989), Algerian football player
Mohamed Billel Benaldjia (born 1988), Algerian football player

See also
Bilal (disambiguation)
Bilal (name)
Bilele, a tributary of the river Jiul de Est in Romania

Arabic masculine given names
Arabic-language surnames

ar:بلال (توضيح)